Claudette Abela Baldacchino (born 1973) is a Maltese politician and journalist who has served as a Member of the European Parliament from 2009 to 2013. In Malta, she represents the Labour Party, where she is president of the Women's Group known as Nisa Laburisti.

Biography
Born on 17 February 1973, Claudette Abela Baldacchino was brought up in the village of Qrendi in southwestern Malta. In addition to a degree in social studies (1999), she is also a graduate in social administration (2005). From 1995, she worked as a journalist and new presenter for Maltese radio and television. In the 2000s, she served as reporter in the Maltese Community of the Regions, taking a special interest in Social Europe and stressing that the most important issue for her was people rather than money.

From 2005, she was a member of the Council of Europe's Congress of Local and Regional Authorities. In 2009, she was elected a Member of the European Parliament where she joined the Committee on Internal Market and Consumer Protection and the Delegation for relations with Australia and New Zealand.

In 2013, Abela Baldacchino was prominent in the press as a result of her standing for the European Parliament elections while facing criminal charges of fraud in connection with travel payments she had claimed.

References

1973 births
Living people
Women MEPs for Malta
Labour Party (Malta) MEPs
MEPs for Malta 2009–2014
21st-century Maltese women politicians
21st-century Maltese politicians
Maltese journalists
Maltese women journalists
People from Qrendi